Nina Rae Wayne is an American actress.

Early years
In her hometown of Chicago, Wayne began taking ballet lessons when she was three years old, and at age 6 she began taking classes in skating. She and her sister performed for the Ice Capades as The Wayne Sisters. That act ended when her sister fell. Wayne stayed with the show for a year as a solo performer, after which she left and became a dancer. She danced in Las Vegas for three years and then the Latin Quarter hired her.

Career
She first appeared on The Tonight Show in October 1964. Wayne, the younger sister of fellow actress Carol Wayne, started working in television in 1965, appearing in 12 episodes of the series Camp Runamuck (as Caprice Yeudleman) and in an episode of Bewitched.

Wayne's first movie was Dead Heat on a Merry-Go-Round. She reportedly was cast in Fantastic Voyage, but the lead female role ultimately went to Raquel Welch. Wayne's breakthrough came when she starred opposite Jack Lemmon and Peter Falk in the 1967 romantic comedy Luv. She followed with The Comic (1969) with Dick Van Dyke and Mickey Rooney. Her last appearance was in the 1973 TV supernatural drama The Night Strangler.

In 1974, she appeared on the cover of TV Guide.

Filmography
 Dead Heat on a Merry-Go-Round (1966) as Frieda Schmid
 Luv (1967) as Linda
 The Comic (1969) as Sybil Atlas
 The Night Strangler (1973) as Charisma Beauty

References

External links

 

Living people
American television actresses
American film actresses
Barrymore family
21st-century American women
Year of birth missing (living people)